François Gillet (France, 1949) is a French photographer based in Stockholm, best known for his still life and child images. He studied photography at the Arts University College at Bournemouth and graduated 1971. Published in international magazines, he has been commissioned by clients all over the world for advertising campaigns such as Fuji (Japan), Silk-Cut (London), Korean airlines, Brown Brothers wineries (Australia), Bonne Maman (France), Orrefors (Sweden). He is also the author of monumental geoglyphs, mosaïcs shot in the Australian Bush, exhibited at the Foto Mässan trade show in Stockholm.

Exhibitions
 FotoMässan Stockholm 2008 "Le Pays du Rêve "
 FotoMässan Stockholm 2007 ”Cubisteries”
 FotoMässan Stockholm 2006 ”Suite Automnale”
 Bièvres: Musée Francais de la Photographie, 1996
 Malmö: Exponera Warehouse Photo gallery, 1996
 Stockholm: World Trade Centre, 1993
 Sweden: Frövifors pappersbruk, 1993
 Paris: « Nudes » Salon de la Photo, 1993
 Milano: Gallery Il Milione, 1986
 Tokyo: Photopia, 1983

Group exhibitions
 Bournemouth: "From here to there" 2009 The Arts Institute
 Arles: « La photographie publicitaire en France » 2006 Musée de l´Arles
 Paris: « La photographie publicitaire en France » De Man Ray à Jean Paul Goude, 2006 Les Arts Décoratifs
 Camera Obscura Stockholm-“ Lust” 1984

Awards
 Top Job Award 1998 photokina, Köln
 Folio Award Australia 1993 Excellence in Magazine Advertising
 London International Advertising Award 1994
 Lions, Cannes 1993 (Silk-Cut) Gold Lion
 Press Advertising Award, England 1993
 Platina Ägget 1990 ABCD Award, Sweden
 D&AD England 1990
 Campaign Poster Advertising Award England 1983–1993
 Australian Writers & Directors  1988–1989–1990
 Eurobest 1989
 Guld Ägget 1982  ABCD Award, Sweden
 Kodak Fotokalendar Preis, Germany  1988
 The Art Directors Club  Merit Award 1988
 The Art Directors Club 59th Annual Exhibition USA Merit Award 1980
 Clio Award   1979

Books

 

 Le Petit Théatre- Japanese edition, 1982

References

External links
francoisgillet.com
"photo of the week" 
"silk-cut" 

Swedish photographers
Living people
Alumni of Arts University Bournemouth
1949 births